The Bisexual Option (1978; second edition 1993) is a book by the sex researcher Fritz Klein. It is considered one of the seminal works on bisexuality in the discipline of queer studies.

Summary
The book shows bisexuals that they are not alone and discusses where people may fit on the sexual orientation continuum.  It also aids in explaining who bisexuals are and why they have problems in heterosexual as well as the mainstream gay/lesbian communities.

See also
Bisexual community
Klein Sexual Orientation Grid
List of media portrayals of bisexuality
Queer studies

References

External links
 The Bisexual Option (Second Edition) on publisher's site
 The Bisexual Option, page at the American Institute of Bisexuality

1978 non-fiction books
1970s LGBT literature
1993 non-fiction books
American non-fiction books
Bisexual non-fiction books
Sexology literature
LGBT literature in the United States